Bykle Church is a parish church of the Church of Norway in Bykle Municipality in Agder county, Norway. It is located in the village of Bykle. It is one of the churches for the Bykle parish which is part of the Otredal prosti (deanery) in the Diocese of Agder og Telemark. The white, wooden church was built in a long church design in 2004 using plans drawn up by the architect Hans Olaf Aanensen from Arendal. The church seats about 220 people.

History
In the late 20th century, the Old Bykle Church (then known as Bykle Church) was deemed to be too old and small for the local congregation, so a new church building was commissioned. Bishop Olav Skjevesland laid the foundation stone for the new Bykle Church on 1 January 2000. The church was consecrated on 4 September 2004 by Bishop Skjevesland and it was named Bykle Church and the old church was renamed Old Bykle Church.

Media gallery

See also
List of churches in Agder og Telemark

References

Bykle
Churches in Agder
Wooden churches in Norway
21st-century Church of Norway church buildings
Churches completed in 2004
2004 establishments in Norway